Globiceps fulvicollis  is a species of plant-feeding insect of the family Miridae.

Distribution and habitat
This species is present in most European countries and the northern Mediterranean to Central Asia 
These bugs mainly live in hedge rows, open areas, dune slacks and damp heaths.

Description
These bugs are mainly black, with pale yellow wide markings. Females have a relatively wide head and very reduced wings (brachyptery), with hemelytra non covering the apex of the abdomen.

This species is very similar to Dryophilocoris flavoquadrimaculatus.

Biology
Adults can be found from June to September, depending on the location. These polyphagous insects mainly feed on juices or nectar of Cytisus scoparius, Vaccinium myrtillus, Calluna vulgaris and Tanacetum vulgare.

References

Miridae
Insects described in 1877
Taxa named by Vasily Evgrafovich Yakovlev